Farhad Ardalan (in Persian:فرهاد اردلان, born 1939, Tehran, Iran) is an Iranian High Energy physicist. He is a professor at Sharif University and the Institute for Studies in Theoretical Physics and Mathematics.

He is known for the proposal of the para-string theory, construction of modular invariant partition functions for WZNW models via the orbifold method, classification of 11-dimensional supergravity solutions with a quotient structure, and discovery of non-commutativity in D-branes of string theory.

He is also known for research work in superstring theory and Yang–Mills theory.

Ardalan and some other prominent Iranian physicists, such as Reza Mansouri and Mehdi Golshani, have been among the main architects of theoretical physics in Iran.

Degrees
His degree history is BA, Columbia College (1963), MA, Columbia University (1966), PhD, Pennsylvania State University (1970).

See also

Higher education in Iran

References

External links
His IPM webpage

1939 births
Living people
Iranian physicists
Academic staff of Sharif University of Technology
Columbia College (New York) alumni
Fellows of the American Physical Society
Columbia Graduate School of Arts and Sciences alumni
Pennsylvania State University alumni